3 Cancri is a single star in the zodiac constellation of Cancer, located around 810 light years from the Sun. It is visible to the naked eye as a dim, orange-hued star with an apparent visual magnitude of 5.60. This object is moving further from the Earth with a heliocentric radial velocity of +39.5 km/s, and may be a member of the Hyades group. It is located near the ecliptic and thus is subject to lunar eclipses.

This is an aging giant star with a stellar classification of K3 III that is most likely (86% chance) on the horizontal branch. The star has 2.9 times the mass of the Sun and has expanded to 40 times the Sun's radius. It is radiating 569 times the Sun's luminosity from its enlarged photosphere at an effective temperature of 4,300 K.

Planetary system 
One super-Jupiter exoplanet orbiting 3 Cancri was detected in 2020 on a very mildly eccentric orbit using the radial velocity method.

See also
 Cancer (Chinese astronomy)
 List of stars in Cancer
Chi Scorpii

References

K-type giants
Cancer (constellation)
Durchmusterung objects
Cancri, 03
065759
039177
3128